De strijdlust is geboren (translation: "The Lust for Combat Is Born") is the debut studio album by the Dutch folk/Viking metal band Heidevolk. Originally released independently in 2005, Napalm Records re-released this album on April 22, 2008, with three bonus tracks originally released on Heidevolk's EP Wodan heerst.

Track listing

Personnel
 Jesse Vuerbaert - vocals, flute
 Paul Braadvraat - bass
 Joost Westdijk - drums
 Sebas Bloeddorst - guitars, tambourine, mouth harp
 Niels Beenkerver - guitars
 Joris Boghtdrincker - vocals

Guest musicians
 Rowan Middelwijk - choir
 Mark Bockting - choir

Production
 Afke Westdijk - photography
 Robert Aarts - mixing
 Klaesch Lageveen - artwork

References

2005 debut albums
Heidevolk albums